Philip Nigel Hawker (born 7 December 1962) is an English former footballer who played as a defender. He scored 11 goals in 213 appearances in the Football League playing for Birmingham City, Walsall and West Bromwich Albion.

Hawker was born in Solihull. He began his football career as an apprentice with Birmingham City where he turned professional in 1980. He deputised at left-back for Mark Dennis in the latter's absence, but was allowed to join Walsall in the 1982–83 season. Hawker spent eight seasons with the club, helping them to promotion to the Second Division in 1988. He scored in the play-off final against Bristol City heading home a corner from Mark Goodwin to make it 3-0 as Walsall won 4–0. He played one league game on loan for West Bromwich Albion before moving into non-league football with Kidderminster Harriers and then Solihull Borough. He went on to run a car dealership.

References

1962 births
Living people
Sportspeople from Solihull
English footballers
Association football defenders
Birmingham City F.C. players
Walsall F.C. players
West Bromwich Albion F.C. players
Kidderminster Harriers F.C. players
Solihull Borough F.C. players
English Football League players